Maraenui is a suburb of the city of Napier, in the Hawke's Bay region of New Zealand's eastern North Island. The New Zealand Ministry for Culture and Heritage gives a translation of "great marae" for Maraenui.

It is a lower socio-economic neighbourhood with a mix of owner occupied and state-owned Housing New Zealand properties, and has a high rate of synthetic drug use.

Demographics

Maraenui had a population of 3,504 at the 2018 New Zealand census, an increase of 411 people (13.3%) since the 2013 census, and a decrease of 33 people (−0.9%) since the 2006 census. There were 984 households, comprising 1,731 males and 1,773 females, giving a sex ratio of 0.98 males per female. The median age was 26.9 years (compared with 37.4 years nationally), with 1,053 people (30.1%) aged under 15 years, 843 (24.1%) aged 15 to 29, 1,326 (37.8%) aged 30 to 64, and 282 (8.0%) aged 65 or older.

Ethnicities were 44.9% European/Pākehā, 58.8% Māori, 14.1% Pacific peoples, 2.7% Asian, and 1.2% other ethnicities. People may identify with more than one ethnicity.

The percentage of people born overseas was 12.1, compared with 27.1% nationally.

Although some people chose not to answer the census's question about religious affiliation, 49.3% had no religion, 31.2% were Christian, 11.6% had Māori religious beliefs, 0.2% were Hindu, 0.5% were Muslim, 0.5% were Buddhist and 1.2% had other religions.

Of those at least 15 years old, 126 (5.1%) people had a bachelor's or higher degree, and 711 (29.0%) people had no formal qualifications. The median income was $20,200, compared with $31,800 nationally. 63 people (2.6%) earned over $70,000 compared to 17.2% nationally. The employment status of those at least 15 was that 1,068 (43.6%) people were employed full-time, 357 (14.6%) were part-time, and 192 (7.8%) were unemployed.

Education
The school opened in 1958, and became New Zealand's first bilingual school in 1988.

References

Suburbs of Napier, New Zealand